Josephsplatz is an U-Bahn station in on the U2 located in Maxvorstadt, Munich, Bavaria, Germany..

References

Munich U-Bahn stations
Railway stations in Germany opened in 1980
1980 establishments in West Germany
Maxvorstadt